The de Havilland DH.88 Comet is a British two-seat, twin-engined aircraft built by the de Havilland Aircraft Company. It was developed specifically to participate in the 1934 England-Australia MacRobertson Air Race from the United Kingdom to Australia.

Development of the Comet was seen as both a prestige project and an entry into the use of modern techniques. It was designed around the specific requirements of the race. Despite being made of wood, it was the first British aircraft to incorporate in one airframe all the elements of the modern high speed aircraft - stressed-skin construction, cantilever monoplane flying surfaces, retractable undercarriage, landing flaps, variable-pitch propellers and an enclosed cockpit.

Three Comets were produced for the race, all for private owners at the discounted price of £5,000 per aircraft. The aircraft underwent a rapid development cycle, performing its maiden flight only six weeks prior to the race. Comet G-ACSS Grosvenor House emerged as the winner. Another two Comets were built after the race. The Comet established many aviation records, both during the race and in its aftermath, as well as participating in further races. Several examples were bought and evaluated by national governments, typically as mail planes. Two Comets, G-ACSS and G-ACSP, survived into preservation, while a number of full-scale replicas have also been constructed.

Development

Background: The Great Air Race

During 1933, the MacRobertson Air Race, a long distance multi-stage journey from the United Kingdom to Australia, was being planned for October 1934, to celebrate the 100th anniversary of the Australian State of Victoria. Sponsored by Macpherson Robertson, an Australian confectionery manufacturer, the race would be flown in stages from England to Melbourne.

Despite a number of previous air racing successes by British companies, a new generation of monoplane airliners that were then being developed in America had no viable rival in Britain at the time. Geoffrey de Havilland, a British aviation pioneer and founder of aircraft manufacturing firm de Havilland, was determined that, for the sake of national prestige, Britain should put up a serious competitor. While the company board recognised that there would be no prospect of recouping the full investment in producing such a machine, they believed that the project would also enhance the company's prestige and, perhaps more importantly, provide much-needed experience in the development of modern fast monoplanes.

This price was estimated as being half of the cost of manufacture. Three orders were indeed received by the deadline; one from Jim Mollison, to be flown by him and his wife Amy (better known as Amy Johnson), one from Arthur Edwards, a hotel owner and manager, and the last from racing motorist Bernard Rubin.

Design phase
Although designed around the requirements for the MacRobertson race, owing to its unusual requirements the Comet did not fit the standard technical specification for a racing aircraft, nevertheless it was classed as a "Special, sub-division (f), Racing or Record". De Havilland paid special attention to the non-stop range necessary for the long official stages. They initially intended to produce a twin-engined two-seat development of the DH.71 experimental monoplane. However it would have insufficient performance so the designer, A. E. Hagg, turned to a more innovative design. He chose a modern cantilever monoplane with enclosed cockpit, retractable undercarriage and flaps. In order to achieve take-off at a reasonable speed and with high all-up weight, combined with a satisfactory high-speed cruise, it would be necessary to fit variable-pitch propellers.

The resulting design had a low, tapered high aspect ratio wing and was powered by two Gipsy Six R engines, a specially-tuned version of the new Gipsy Six. The aircraft was composed almost entirely of wood, the limited use of metal being confined to high-stress components, such as the engine bearers and undercarriage, and to complex curved fairings such as the engine cowlings and wing root fairings. The sheet metal parts comprised a lightweight magnesium-aluminium alloy. Manually-actuated split flaps were fitted beneath the wing's inboard rear sections and lower fuselage, while the Frise ailerons were mass-balanced by lead strips within the aileron's leading edges. Both the rudder and elevators fitted to the conventional tail had horn mass balances. In order to validate the wing design, a half-scale model wing was built and tested to destruction. The exterior skin was treated via a time-consuming and repetitive process of painting and rubbing down to produce a highly smooth surface to reduce air friction and increase overall speed.

Aerodynamic efficiency was a major design priority and it was therefore decided to use a thin wing of RAF34 section. This was not thick enough to contain spars of sufficient depth to carry the flight loads and so the wing skin would have to carry most of the loads in a "stressed-skin" construction. However, the complex curves required for aerodynamic efficiency could not be manufactured using plywood. Hagg, who also had experience as a naval architect, adapted a construction technique previously used for building lifeboats. It was built as a single assembly around three box-spars located at 21, 40 and 65 percent chord: there was an intermediate spruce stringer between each pair of spars to prevent buckling. The ribs were made of birch ply and spruce. The outboard  were skinned with various thicknesses of ply because of the difficulty of machining spruce planking to less than 0.07 in thickness. The leading edge, forward of the front spar, was also ply covered. The centre section was reinforced with two additional layers of 0.07 in spruce. This method of construction had been made possible only by the recent development of high-strength synthetic bonding resins and its success took many in the industry by surprise.

The fuselage was built principally from plywood over spruce longerons, while the upper and lower forward section were built up from spruce planking in order to achieve the necessary compound curves. As with the wing, the strength of the structure was dependent upon the skin. Fuel was carried in three fuselage tanks. The two main tanks filled in the nose and centre section in front of the cockpit. A third auxiliary tank, of only 20 gallon capacity, was placed immediately behind it and could be used to adjust the aircraft's trim. The pilot and navigator were seated in tandem in a cockpit set aft of the wing. While dual flight controls were fitted, only the forward position had a full set of flight instruments. The rear crew member could also see many of the pilot's instruments by craning sideways while seated. The cockpit was set low in order to reduce drag and forward visibility was very poor. The engines were uprated versions of de Havilland's newly developed Gipsy Six, race-tuned for optimum performance with a higher compression ratio and with a reduced frontal area. The main undercarriage retracted backwards into the engine nacelles and was operated manually, requiring 14 turns of a large handwheel located on the right hand side of the cockpit.

The challenging production schedule meant that flight tests of the DH.88 began just six weeks prior to the start of the race. Hamilton-Standard hydromatic variable-pitch propellers were initially fitted. During testing, the propeller blade roots were found to interfere unacceptably with the airflow into the engine. Instead, a French two-position pneumatically actuated Ratier type was substituted. Its blades were manually set to fine pitch before takeoff using a bicycle pump, and in flight they were repositioned automatically to coarse (high-speed) pitch via a pressure sensor. A drawback was that the propellers could not be reset to fine pitch except on the ground. Other changes included the installation of a large landing light fitted in the nose and a revised, higher profile to the cockpit to give the pilot marginally improved visibility.

Operational history

MacRobertson Race
All three Comets lined up for the start of the race at Mildenhall, a newly established airfield in Suffolk shortly to be handed over to the RAF. G-ACSP was painted black and named Black Magic, G-ACSR green and unnamed, G-ACSS red and named Grosvenor House. The three aircraft took their places among 17 other entrants, which ranged from new high-speed Douglas DC-2 and Boeing 247 airliners to old Fairey Fox biplanes.

G-ACSP Black Magic
Jim Mollison and his wife Amy (born Amy Johnson) were both famous aviators in their own right and were the first entrants to take off in their own G-ACSP Black Magic.

At 6:30a.m. on 20 October 1934, they began a non-stop leg to the first compulsory staging point at Baghdad, the only crew who managed to fly this first leg non-stop. Arriving next at Karachi at 4:53a.m they set a new England-India record. They made two attempts to leave Karachi, the first time they returned when their landing gear failed to retract, and the second time they returned after finding they had the wrong map. They finally departed Karachi at 9:05p.m. for Allahabad. After drifting off course, they made an unscheduled stop at Jabalpur to refuel and discover their position. With no aviation fuel available, they had to use motor car fuel provided by a local bus company; a piston seized and an oil line ruptured. They flew on to Allahabad on one engine but, by now needing completely new engines, were forced to retire.

G-ACSS Grosvenor House

Arthur Edwards named his red Comet G-ACSS after the Grosvenor House Hotel of which he was managing director. He engaged C. W. A. Scott and Tom Campbell Black to fly it in the race.

Having landed at Kirkuk to refuel, they arrived at Baghdad after the Mollisons had left but took off again after a half-hour turnaround. Scott and Campbell Black missed out Karachi and flew non-stop to Allahabad where they were told they were the first to arrive, having overtaken the Mollisons. Despite a severe storm over the Bay of Bengal, in which both pilots had to wrestle with the controls together, they reached Singapore safely, eight hours ahead of the DC-2.

They took off for Darwin, losing power in the port engine over the Timor Sea but struggled on to Darwin.  Their official time was 70 hours 54 minutes 18 seconds.

G-ACSR
The third Comet, G-ACSR had been painted in British racing green by Bernard Rubin who was a successful motor race driver. He had intended to fly it himself along with Ken Waller but had to pull out at the last minute due to ill health and instead engaged Owen Cathcart Jones to take his place.

On reaching Baghdad, they overshot it in the dark, landing by a village when they ran low on fuel. Leaving at first light, they just made it to Baghdad on empty tanks. On taking off again they found that they had a serious oil leak and had to return for repairs. These repairs were carried out by T.J. Holmes RAF (while in Baghdad on RAF secondment. More trouble was encountered on the Darwin leg so they landed at Batavia,  They were the fourth aircraft to reach Melbourne, in a time of 108 h 13 min 30 s. Cathcart Jones and Waller promptly collected film of the Australian stages of the race and set off the next day to carry it back to Britain. Their return time of 13 days 6 hr 43 min set a new record.

After the race

Grosvenor House was dismantled and shipped back to England. It was later bought by the Air Ministry, given the military serial K5084, painted silver overall with RAF markings and flown to RAF Martlesham Heath for evaluation by the Aeroplane and Armament Experimental Establishment. It made several flights before being written off in a heavy landing and sold for scrap. It was subsequently sold on, rebuilt by Essex Aero and fitted with Gipsy Six series II engines and a castoring tailwheel. In this form it made several race and record attempts under various names. It claimed fourth place in the 1937 Istres-Damascus-Paris race and 12th in the King's Cup the next month. Later in  the same year it lowered the out-and-home record to the Cape to 15 days 17 hours. In March 1938, A. E. Clouston and Victor Ricketts made a return trip to New Zealand covering  in 10 days 21 hours 22 minutes.

In G-ACSR, the day after they finished the race Cathcart Jones and Waller took off on the return journey. Suffering engine trouble, at Allahabad they found the Mollisons still there and were generously given two good pistons from Black Magic to allow them to continue. Arriving back in England they set a new round-trip record of 13 days, 6 hours and 43 minutes. That December, named Reine Astrid in honour of the Belgian queen, G-ACSR flew the Christmas mail from Brussels to Leopoldville in the Belgian Congo. It was then sold to the French government and modified as mail plane F-ANPY, its delivery flight setting a Croydon-Le Bourget record on 5 July 1935. It subsequently made Paris–Casablanca and Paris—Algiers high-speed proving flights with the name Cité d'Angoulême IV. Formerly believed destroyed alongside F-ANPZ, F-ANPY was last seen in an unflyable condition at Étampes in France in 1940.

Black Magic was sold to Portugal for a projected flight from Lisbon to Rio de Janeiro. Re-registered CS-AAJ and renamed Salazar it was damaged on its attempted takeoff at Sintra Air Base for the Atlantic crossing. On a later return flight from Hatfield it made a record flight from London to Lisbon, setting a time of 5 hr, 17 min in July 1937.

Other Comets
Following the French government's acquisition of F-ANPY (see above), they ordered a fourth Comet, F-ANPZ, with a mail compartment in the nose. It was later taken on charge by the French Air Force before being destroyed in a hangar fire at Istres in France in June 1940.

The fifth and last Comet, registered G-ADEF and named Boomerang, was built for Cyril Nicholson. It was piloted by Tom Campbell Black and J. C. McArthur in an attempt on the London-Cape Town record. It reached Cairo in a record 11 hr, 18 min, but the next leg of the journey was cut short due to oil trouble while in flight over Sudan. On 21 September 1935, Campbell Black and McArthur took off in "Boomerang" from Hatfield in another attempt at the Cape record. The aircraft crashed while flying over Sudan on 22 September 1935 due to propeller problems, the crew escaping by parachute.

Record flights
The de Havilland Comets set many record times for long-distance flights during the 1930s, both during races and on special record-breaking flights. Some flights set multiple point-to-point records.

Surviving aircraft

G-ACSS was requisitioned for the RAF once again in 1943 but soon passed on to de Havilland. Restored for static display as Grosvenor House, it was put on show for the 1951 Festival of Britain. The Shuttleworth Collection at Old Warden acquired it in 1965 and then in 1972 re-registered it under its original identity for restoration to flying condition, finally achieved in 1987. It is regarded as "one of the most significant British aircraft still flying."

CS-AAJ Salazar was rediscovered in Portugal after being lost for more than 40 years. It was brought back to the UK and re-registered once again as G-ACSP. As of 2020 restoration continues, with a view to it flying again in its original livery as Black Magic, by the Comet Racer Project Group at the Amy Johnson Comet Restoration Centre, Derby Airfield.

Airworthy reproductions and replicas
N88XD is a full-scale flying replica Comet. Built in 1993 for Thomas W. Wathen of Santa Barbara, CA by Bill Turner of Repeat Aircraft at Flabob Airport in Rubidoux, California, it wears the livery of G-ACSS Grosvenor House.

A replica, originally started by George Lemay in Canada, was acquired by the Croydon Aircraft Company based at Old Mandeville Airfield, near Gore, New Zealand, where it is currently still under construction.

G-RCSR is a reproduction Comet based on the original construction drawings, being built by Ken Fern in parallel with the restoration of Black Magic at Derby.

Operators

Armée de l'Air

Portuguese Government

Air Ministry (for evaluation)
 Shuttleworth Collection

Specifications

Cultural influence

The MacRobertson Air Race was an event of world-wide importance and did much to drive aeroplane design forward. The triumph of the Comet and its high-speed design marked a milestone in aviation.

The Comet Hotel, Hatfield was begun the year before the race, as one of the first modernist inns in England. Located close to the de Havilland factory, when it was finished it was named after the Comet Racer. War artist Eric Kennington was commissioned to create a  carved column in its car park, which was erected in 1936. On its top is mounted a famous model of the Comet, currently in the livery of Grosvenor House.

Full-scale but non-flying replicas of Grosvenor House and Black Magic were constructed for the 1990 TV two-part Australian-produced dramatisation Half a World Away, which was also released on DVD as The Great Air Race. The G-ACSS replica was taxi-able and has since been partially restored in the livery of G-ACSR and is on static display at the De Havilland Aircraft Museum, Salisbury Hall, UK.

Comets have also appeared in fiction, see Aircraft in fiction#de Havilland DH.88 Comet.

See also

Notes

References

Citations

Bibliography
 "For the England Australia Air Race: The de Havilland 'Comet', Flight, Volume 26, No. 1343, 20 September 1934, pp. 968–972.
 Jackson, A. J. De Havilland Aircraft Since 1909. London: Putnam, Third edition, 1987. .
 Lewis, Peter. British Racing and Record Breaking Aircraft. London: Putnam, 1970. .

 Ogilvy, David. DH88: deHavilland's Racing Comets. Shrewsbury, Airlife, 1988. .
 Ramsden, J. M. "The Comet's Tale – Part 2". Aeroplane Monthly, Vol. 16, No. 5. May 1988. pp. 279–283. ISSN 0143-7240.
 Ricco, Philippe. "La Comète en France, Part 1", Aeroplane Monthly, Vol. 35, No. 439. November 2009.
 Ricco, Philippe. "La Comète en France, Part 2: The Burden of Proof". Aeroplane Monthly, Vol. 38, No. 449. September 2010.
 Sharp, C. Martin; DH: An Outline of de Havilland History. London, Faber & Faber, 1960.
 Taylor, H. A. "The First "Wooden Wonder"". Air Enthusiast, No. 10, July–September 1979. pp. 51–57. 
 "The Story of the Australia Race",  Flight, Volume 26, No. 1348, 25 October 1934, pp. 1110–1117.

External links

 Sound recording of G-ACSS, Aircraft Sound Recordings.
 video of G-ACSS arriving in Australia

Racing aircraft
1930s British mailplanes
1930s British sport aircraft
DH.088
Low-wing aircraft
Aircraft first flown in 1934
Twin piston-engined tractor aircraft